Bradford Forster Square may refer to:

Bradford Forster Square railway station, serves Bradford, West Yorkshire, England
Forster Square, Bradford, an urban square in Bradford, West Yorkshire, England